As Seen Through Windows is the second album by Canadian band Bell Orchestre. It was recorded at Soma Electric Studios in Chicago, IL.

Track listing
 "Stripes" — 2:18
 "Elephants" — 8:53
 "Icicles/Bicycles" — 6:15
 "Water/Light/Shifts" — 3:09
 "Bucephalus Bouncing Ball" — 4:56
 "As Seen Through Windows" — 8:11
 "The Gaze" — 2:38
 "Dark Lights" — 5:28
 "Air Lines/Land Lines" — 11:50

References

2009 albums
Bell Orchestre albums
Arts & Crafts Productions albums